Axel Buch (10 August 1930 – 30 July 1998) was a Norwegian politician from the Conservative Party.

He is known as mayor of Trondheim, the third largest city in Norway, from 1976 to 1979.

Buch served as a deputy representative in the Norwegian Parliament from Sør-Trøndelag during the terms 1977–1981 and 1981–1985.

References
 

1930 births
1998 deaths
Deputy members of the Storting
Conservative Party (Norway) politicians
Mayors of Trondheim